is a Japanese footballer currently playing as a defender for Vegalta Sendai.

Career statistics

Club

Notes

References

External links

2000 births
Living people
Association football people from Chiba Prefecture
Japanese footballers
Association football defenders
J1 League players
J3 League players
Vegalta Sendai players
Azul Claro Numazu players